One-two, 1-2, 1 & 2 or  1+2 may refer to:

Sports
 Push and run, in association football
 One-two combo, in boxing

Music
 One, Two, album by Sister Nancy
 1 + 2 (album), album by Recoil
 Volumes 1 & 2 (The Desert Sessions album), 1998
 Volumes, 1 & 2 (Smith & Myers EPs), 2020

Other uses
 One & Two, 2015 independent film
 OnePlus 2, an Android smartphone released in 2015
 Schweizer SGU 1-2 glider

See also
 One-Two-Two, Parisian landmark
 12 (disambiguation)
 Onetwo (band), English duo